Yuh Nung Jan (born January 11, 1947) is a Chinese-American neuroscientist. He is the Jack and DeLoris Lange Professor of Molecular Physiology at the University of California, San Francisco, where he works together with his wife Lily Jan as co-PIs of the Jan Lab.

Biography
Jan was born in Shanghai, China to a family from Jiangxi. His birthday is officially listed as December 20, 1946, but that is according to the Chinese calendar and corresponds to January 11, 1947 of the Western calendar. In 1949, his family escaped to Xinpu, Hsinchu, Taiwan. Although Jan attended a prestigious public school like his future wife Lily Jan his talents in science remained undiscovered until he excelled in a nationwide college entrance exam placing in the top 10 out of 30,000 students.

Jan would go on to attend National Taiwan University (NTU) for his undergraduate studies where he earned his B.S. in physics in 1968. Jan fulfilled his military service as a communication and electronics officer in the Taiwanese Air Force. Jan has shared the year of his service he purchased a motorcycle so he could sneak off the base to visit Lily Jan who he had met earlier during a weeklong hiking trip in 1967. Lily Jan was a fellow student studying physics at National Taiwan University and would become his future wife. At the time, both of the Jans were interested in pursuing advanced studies in theoretical high-energy physics and applied to graduate school abroad. They were both accepted to the physics program at Caltech. They were the only two students to be accepted from NTU, a major academic achievement given how few foreign students were accepted to the program at the time and especially so from their university.

In line with his research interests as an undergraduate, Jan began his graduate studies at Caltech with the intention to study theoretical physics. However, research seminars at Caltech and a conversation with Max Delbrück, a winner of the 1969 Nobel Prize, inspired Yuh Nung to switch fields to biology. Max Delbrück would become his Ph.D. advisor which was particularly formative given that Delbrück was also a physicist who later switched fields to biological physics. Jan's Ph.D. studies were focused on studying the perception of sensory signals by a single-celled fungus. Although he was in the same thesis lab as Lily Jan, their research paths were distinct and they would in fact not begin their life-long scientific collaboration or publish together until after they graduated Caltech with their degrees.

As he approached graduation, Yuh Nung would come across a publication by the scientist Seymour Benzer detailing opportunities associated with correlating fly embryo morphology with functional behavior. Inspired by opportunities associated with such lines of research, Yuh Nung decided to pursue post-doctoral studies in the field. In preparation for this shift in research, he and Lily Jan spent a summer at Cold Spring Harbor learning techniques in experimental neuroscience. This would mark the start of their life-long collaboration in the experimental laboratory and later in their roles as independent investigators. Upon joining the Benzer laboratory as post-docs later that year, they would build their first experimental set-up together, an electrophysiology rig. Their early collaborative research in the Benzer group was focused on uncovering the basis for defects in synaptic transmission. A series of mutant flies, named Shaker, with uncontrolled muscle contractions proved crucial to these endeavors and set the stage for some of their most significant contributions in the field of neuroscience.

The Jans would later move to Harvard Medical School for a second postdoc with Steven Kuffler. Jan and his wife then joined the faculty at UCSF in 1979 where they are co-PIs of the Jan Lab and have won numerous awards together. Jan has been an Howard Hughes Medical Institute investigator since 1984.

Awards 

 Vilcek Prize in Biomedical Science (2017)
Gruber Prize in Neuroscience (2012)
 Wiley Prize in Biomedical Sciences
 Edward M. Scolnick Prize in Neuroscience, McGovern Institute for Brain Research at MIT
 Ralph W. Gerard Prize, Society for Neuroscience
 Distinguished Alumni Award, California Institute of Technology
 Faculty Research Award, UCSF
 Outstanding Faculty Mentorship Award, Postdoctoral Scholars Association of UCSF
 W. Alden Spencer Award, Columbia University
 Jacob Javits Neuroscience Investigator Award, National Institute of Neurological Disorders and Stroke
 K.S. Cole Award, Biophysical Society
 SCBA Presidential Award, Society of Chinese Bioscientists in America

Personal and family life 
In 1967, Lily Jan traveled to Shitou, Taiwan for a hiking trip to celebrate her college graduation; this trip resulted in her meeting Yuh-Nung and the beginning of their relationship. In 1971, Lily and Yuh-Nung married with a simple ceremony in a Los Angeles courthouse followed by a celebration camping and hiking in Yosemite.

The Jans had their first child together a daughter, Emily Huan-Ching Jan, on August 6, 1977. Remarkably, Lily Jan was still involved in research leading up to her due date and went into early stages of labor in the midst of Seymour Benzer's group meeting. Just seven weeks later after celebrating the arrival of Emily, the Jans would move across the country to begin the next stages of their research careers at Harvard Medical School.

Just a few years later, the Jans had established their independent research group at UCSF. In 1984, they were named Howard Hughes Medical Institute investigators. That same year on November 7, 1984 the Jans welcomed their second child a son named Max Huang-Wen Jan after the Jans’ Ph.D. adviser, Max Delbruck.

The Jans have shared that before their children went to college they rarely attended scientific meetings together such that there was always one parent at home with their children. Outside of the lab, they have continued to enjoy their shared interest in exploration and hiking throughout their careers. And in 2011, after their visiting professorship at the Chinese Academy of the Sciences the Jans accomplished one of their lifelong goals together, seeing Mt. Everest from the base camp in Tibet.

References 

1947 births
Living people
American neuroscientists
Biologists from Shanghai
California Institute of Technology alumni
Chinese emigrants to the United States
Chinese neuroscientists
Educators from Shanghai
Howard Hughes Medical Investigators
Members of Academia Sinica
Members of the United States National Academy of Sciences
National Taiwan University alumni
Taiwanese emigrants to the United States
Taiwanese people from Shanghai
University of California, San Francisco faculty
Chinese Civil War refugees